Zhao Tao (born 28 January 1977)  is a Chinese actress. She works in China and occasionally Europe, and has appeared in 10 films and several shorts since starting her career in 1999. She is best known for her collaborations with her husband, director Jia Zhangke, including Platform (2000) and Still Life (2006). With Shun Li and the Poet (2011), she became the first Asian actress to win a prize at David di Donatello. She received two Golden Horse Award nominations for Mountains May Depart (2015) and Ash Is Purest White (2018). In 2020, The New York Times ranked her #8 on its list of the 25 Greatest Actors of the 21st Century.

Biography
Zhao was born 28 January 1977 in Taiyuan, Shanxi, which is also the hometown of the heroine in Still Life. As a child, she studied classical Chinese dance. In 1996, she enrolled in the folk dance department at Beijing Dance Academy. After graduation, she became a dance teacher in Taiyuan Normal College, where she was spotted by Jia during casting for Platform. Since then, they have worked together frequently.

In 2011, she starred in the Italian film Shun Li and the Poet by Andrea Segre, which screened in the Venice Days section of the 68th Venice International Film Festival. Zhao won the David di Donatello Award, the Italian Oscar, for Best Actress for her bilingual role.

Personal life
On 7 January 2012, Zhao married director Jia Zhangke.

Complete filmography

References

External links

 Conversation with Zhao Tao and Jia Zhangke at Asia Society
 
 

Living people
21st-century Chinese actresses
Actresses from Shanxi
Chinese film actresses
People from Taiyuan
David di Donatello winners
1977 births
Asia Pacific Screen Award winners